Lester Don Holt Jr. (born March 8, 1959) is an American journalist and news anchor for the weekday edition of NBC Nightly News     NBC Nightly News Kids Edition and Dateline NBC. On June 18, 2015, Holt was made the permanent anchor of NBC Nightly News following the demotion of Brian Williams. Holt followed in the career footsteps of Max Robinson, an ABC News evening co-anchor, and Holt became the first African-American to solo anchor a weekday network nightly newscast.

According to a 2018 poll, Holt was ranked as being the most trusted TV news anchor in America. Holt was also known for his moderation of the first presidential debate of 2016 and was praised by The Washington Post columnists for his role in fact-checking false statements. While NBC Nightly News was the top-ranked evening news program for over 30 years during the Tom Brokaw and Brian Williams eras, ratings dropped to second place after Holt began as anchor.

Early life and education
Holt was born on March 8, 1959, on Hamilton Air Force Base, Marin County, California, the youngest child of four of June (DeRozario) and Lester Don Holt Sr. His maternal grandparents were born in Jamaica. His maternal grandfather Canute DeRozario was an Anglo-Indian and was one of 14 children of an Indo-Jamaican father from Calcutta, India, and a White Jamaican mother from England. His maternal grandmother, May, was born in Jamaica but raised in Harlem, New York, where his mother was born. His father was African American from Michigan, with roots in Tennessee.

He graduated from Cordova High School in Rancho Cordova in 1977 and majored in government at California State University, Sacramento, though he never graduated. In 2012, Holt told American Profile news magazine: "My first on-air job was actually as a disc jockey at a Country and Western station. The only time I could land a full-time gig was if I was willing to report the news." Holt would keep the job with the radio station through his college years.

Career
Holt spent 19 years with CBS, as a reporter, anchor, and international correspondent.

In 1981, he was hired as a reporter for WCBS-TV in New York City. In 1982, he became a reporter and weekend anchor on KNXT in Los Angeles, and the next year he returned because to WCBS-TV as a reporter and weekend anchor. In 1986, Holt moved to WBBM-TV in Chicago, where he spent 14 years anchoring the evening news. Holt not only worked at the anchor desk but also reported extensively from troubled spots around the world, including Iraq, Northern Ireland, Somalia, El Salvador and Haiti.

Holt joined MSNBC in 2000. In 2003, he assumed full-time duties at NBC News, where he became a substitute anchor for NBC Nightly News and Today. Holt became a full-time co-anchor of Weekend Today following the death of previous co-anchor David Bloom. Until late 2005, he also anchored a two-hour daily newscast on MSNBC. On May 9, 2007, Holt was named anchor of the weekend edition of NBC Nightly News, anchoring the show for eight years before replacing Brian Williams as permanent anchor of the weekday edition. Additionally, Holt is the current host for NBC's Dateline. He moderated a presidential debate in 2016, and interviewed President Donald Trump in 2017, where fellow journalists said that he asked tough but appropriate questions. 

In addition to his primary responsibilities at NBC News, he hosted a special for The History Channel about the 9/11 conspiracy theories, served as a sportsdesk reporter for NBC Sports coverage of the 2008 Summer Olympics, and is the host of Dateline on ID, an edition of Dateline NBC shown on the Investigation Discovery network.  In 2008, he narrated a documentary regarding actual crystal skulls on the Sci-Fi Channel.

When Brian Williams took medical leave in 2013 for knee replacement surgery, Holt filled in as weekday anchor. In 2015, Williams was suspended for reportedly exaggerating a story about the Iraq War, and Holt permanently replaced him as NBC Nightly News anchor.

Holt moderated the Democratic presidential candidates' debate in January 2016, alongside a panel of NBC political reporters, as well as the first presidential debate on September 26, 2016. Presidential candidate Donald Trump said that this was "a very unfair system" because "Lester is a Democrat". Holt was at the time a registered Republican. However in 2018, he changed his party affiliation to independent. After the debate, Donald Trump said that Holt did "a good job." Journalists also said that Holt performed admirably; for example he challenged Trump when Trump said that he originally opposed the war in Iraq, which was proven to be a false statement. The Washington Post said "Kudos to Holt" for making it clear that stop and frisk was ruled unconstitutional in New York, when Trump said it wasn't.

In May 2017, when Holt interviewed President Trump, they discussed Trump's firing of FBI director James Comey. Holt's interview with Trump resulted in extensive media coverage.

Other work
Holt has made cameo appearances in the 1993 film The Fugitive; its 1998 sequel U.S. Marshals; and Primal Fear (1996); as well as on television shows, including playing himself in episodes of Law & Order: Special Victims Unit; the episode "Red, White, or Blue" of the series Due South; "Fate" of Early Edition and "A New Hope" of Warehouse 13. He appeared on the episode "Cleveland" of the NBC sitcom 30 Rock. He also did a voice-over in the episode "Sandwich Day," announcing that Jack Donaghy would be a new cabinet member in the Bush administration. Holt announced the 2006, 2007, and 2008 Westminster Kennel Club Dog Show for the USA Network, and was featured in Making Music magazine. He also hosted the 2008 Sci-Fi Channel documentary Mystery of the Crystal Skulls. On May 31, 2020, Holt delivered a virtual commencement speech for the 254th graduating class of Rutgers University due to the COVID-19 pandemic.

Career timeline
 1981–2000: CBS owned and operated stations
 1981–1982: WCBS-TV reporter
 1982–1983: KNXT weekend anchor and reporter
 1983–1986: WCBS-TV anchor
 1986–2000: WBBM-TV anchor and reporter
 2000–present: NBC News
 2000–2003: NBC News / MSNBC correspondent
 2003–2015: Weekend Today co-anchor
 2003–present: Today fill-in anchor
 2007–2015: NBC Nightly News Weekend anchor
 2009–2015: Why Planes Crash voiceover
 2011–present: Dateline NBC anchor
 August 6, 2013 – September 2, 2013, and February 9, 2015 – June 18, 2015: NBC Nightly News interim anchor
 June 22, 2015 – present: NBC Nightly News anchor/managing editor (added managing editor in April 2021)

Awards and honors

 1990: Robert F. Kennedy Journalism Award for his work on CBS's 48 Hours: No Place Like Home . 
 2012: Honorary Doctorate from Pepperdine University
 2015: Honorary Doctorate from California State University, Sacramento
 2015: Inducted into the California Hall of Fame on October 28, 2015
 2016: Alan B. DuMont Broadcaster of the Year from Montclair State University
 2016: NABJ Journalist of the Year Award from the National Association of Black Journalists
 2019: Walter Cronkite Award for Excellence in Journalism
 2020: Honorary Doctorate from Rutgers University

Personal life
Holt resides in Manhattan with his wife, Carol Hagen; they have two sons, Stefan and Cameron. Stefan Holt graduated in 2009 from Pepperdine University and was the morning news anchor at NBC-owned WMAQ-TV in Chicago. In 2016, Stefan moved to the same floor as his father's Nightly News when joining WNBC, and he eventually succeeded veteran Chuck Scarborough as anchor of the station's 11 p.m. news broadcast.  Stefan currently is the 10:00 pm anchor at NBC affiliate WMAQ in Chicago.

Lester Holt plays bass guitar and the upright bass.

Holt attends the Manhattan Church of Christ in New York.

See also
 New Yorkers in journalism

References

External links

 
 Lester Holt at Today
 

}

1959 births
Living people
20th-century American journalists
21st-century American journalists
African-American Christians
African-American journalists
African-American television hosts
African-American television personalities
American male journalists
American writers of Indian descent
American members of the Churches of Christ
American people of English descent
American people of Jamaican descent
American television hosts
American television reporters and correspondents
California State University, Sacramento alumni
NBC News people
New York (state) Independents
New York (state) Republicans
Journalists from New York City
People from Manhattan
People from Rancho Cordova, California
Television anchors from Chicago
Television anchors from Los Angeles
California Republicans
20th-century African-American people
21st-century African-American people